Acantholycosa azyuzini is a species of wolf spider only known from the Altai Mountains.

This spider can only be separated from its closest congeners by details of the genitalia.

References

Lycosidae
Spiders described in 1996
Spiders of Asia